Podocarpus longefoliolatus is a species of conifer in the family Podocarpaceae. It is endemic to New Caledonia.

References

longefoliolatus
Endangered plants
Endemic flora of New Caledonia
Taxonomy articles created by Polbot